Åsen is a village in Levanger municipality in Trøndelag county, Norway.  The village is located between the lakes Hammervatnet and Hoklingen.  The European route E06 highway and the Nordlandsbanen railway line both pass through the village.  The train stops at Åsen Station.  The village is centered around the agriculture and forestry industries.  There is also some woodworking industries, including an organ-making factory.  The village is also the site of Åsen Church.

From 1838 until 1962, the village of Åsen was the administrative centre of the municipality of Åsen.

See also
John Johnsen Wold

References

Villages in Trøndelag
Levanger